The Orleans Central Supervisory Union is a school district responsible for the education of students in the Vermont towns of Albany, Barton, Brownington, Glover, Irasburg, Orleans, and Westmore. This requires maintaining one elementary school in each of these towns, plus the Lake Region Union High School, in Orleans. The union is headquartered in Orleans.

Lake Region Union High School Board

The Lake Region Union High School school board consists of the following members, elected by the various participating towns and villages:
Chairman - Dave Thurber, Brownington
Vice Chairman - Linda Michneiweicz, Westmore
Clerk - Darlene Young, Glover

Orleans - Dave Blodgett, Toni Eubanks
Albany - Maybeth Whitten
Barton - Dan Lussier, Wendy Poutre
Irasburg - Michael Sanville, Renee Fontaine

The OCSU Board is chaired by Dan Lussier of Barton with Vice-Chair Thea Swartz of Orleans.

Superintendent (appointed) - Stephen Urgenson (contract expires 2010)
Business Manager (appointed) - Susan Watson

History
In 2004, the district sent certain at-risk students to Wheeler Mountain Academy. In 2008, they announced that they would terminate this relationship in 2009.

In 2008, Union students' performance on the standardized New England Common Assessment Program tests appeared to outperform the North Country Supervisory Union (eight out of ten worst performing).

Required by the state to do so, it furnished a part-time interventionist at the parochial St. Paul's school in 2010.

Footnotes 

School districts in Vermont
Albany, Vermont
Barton, Vermont
Brownington, Vermont
Glover, Vermont
Irasburg, Vermont
Orleans, Vermont
Westmore, Vermont
Orleans Central Supervisory Union School District
Education in Orleans County, Vermont